was a Japanese writer.

Inagaki was born in Osaka, moved to Akashi in Hyōgo Prefecture while he was in elementary school, and spent much of his childhood in Kōbe. He graduated from Kwansei Gakuin Junior High School. In 1923 he published One Thousand and One Second Stories (Issen ichibyō monogatari), and by 1926 he was counted among members of the short-lived Shinkankakuha group of writers.

Inagaki's works often dealt with themes including flight, astronomical objects, and erotic and romantic relationships among beautiful adolescent boys. His stories on the latter topic, and his essays in Shōnen'ai no Bigaku, were an influence on early writers of the yaoi genre such as Keiko Takemiya.

References 

1900 births
1977 deaths
Japanese male short story writers
Writers from Hyōgo Prefecture
Writers from Osaka
20th-century Japanese novelists
20th-century Japanese short story writers
20th-century Japanese male writers